Martuthunira may refer to:
 Martuthunira people, aboriginal people of Australia
 Martuthunira language, their extinct language